A hinge is a mechanical bearing that connects two solid objects, typically allowing only a limited angle of rotation between them. Two objects connected by an ideal hinge rotate relative to each other about a fixed axis of rotation: all other translations or rotations being prevented, and thus a hinge has one degree of freedom. Hinges may be made of flexible material or of moving components. In biology, many joints function as hinges, like the elbow joint.

History
Ancient remains of stone, marble, wood, and bronze hinges have been found. Some date back to at least Ancient Egypt.

In Ancient Rome, hinges were called cardō and gave name to the goddess Cardea and the main street Cardo. This name cardō lives on figuratively today as "the chief thing (on which something turns or depends)" in words such as cardinal. 

According to the OED, the English word hinge is related to hang.

Door hinges

 Barrel hinge A barrel hinge consists of a sectional barrel (the knuckle) secured by a pivot. A barrel is simply a hollow cylinder.  The vast majority of hinges operate on the barrel principle.
 Butt hinge / Mortise hinge Any hinge which is designed to be set into a door frame and/ or door is considered to be a butt hinge or a mortise hinge.  A hinge can also be made as a half-mortise, in which case only one half of the hinge is mortised and the other is not.  Most mortise hinges are also barrel hinges by virtue of how they pivot (i.e., a pair of leaves secured to each other by knuckles through which runs a pin). 
 Butterfly/ Parliament (UK) hinge These are a decorative variety of barrel hinge with leaves somewhat resembling the wings of a butterfly
 Case hinges Case hinges are similar to a butt hinge however usually more of a decorative nature most commonly used in suitcases, briefcases, and the like.
Concealed hinge These are used for furniture doors (with or without self-closing feature, and with or without damping systems). They are made of two parts: One part is the hinge cup and the arm, the other part is the mounting plate. Also called "cup hinge", or "Euro hinge", as they were developed in Europe and use metric installation standards. Most such concealed hinges offer the advantage of full in situ adjustability for standoff distance from the cabinet face as well as pitch and roll by means of two screws on each hinge.
 Continuous/ Piano hinge This variety of barrel hinge runs the entire length of a door, panel, box., etc. Continuous hinges are manufactured with or without holes.
 Flag hinge these consist of a single leaf attached (in the male variety) to a pin.  When used, the pin is inserted into the other (female) portion of the hinge.  This allows the objects to be easily removed (for example, a removable door). They are manufactured in right-hand and left-hand configurations.
H hinge These barrel hinges are shaped like an H and used on flush-mounted doors. Small H hinges tend to be used for cabinets hinges, while larger hinges are for passage doors or closet doors.
 HL hinge These were common for passage doors, room doors, and closet doors in the 17th, 18th, and even 19th centuries. On taller doors, H hinges were occasionally used in the middle along with the HL hinges.
 Pivot hinge This hinge pivots in openings in the floor and the top of the door frame. Also referred to as a double-acting floor hinge. This type is found in ancient dry stone buildings and rarely in old wooden buildings. These are also called haar-hung doors. They are a low-cost alternative for use with lightweight doors.
 Self-closing hinge This is a spring-loaded hinge with a speed control function. The same as spring hinge, usually use spring to provide force to close the door and provide a mechanical or hydraulic damper to control door close speed. That can prevent door slamming problem while auto closes a door.
Spring hinge This is a spring-loaded hinge made to provide assistance in the closing or the opening of the hinge leaves. A spring is a component of a hinge, that applies force to secure a hinge closed or keep a hinge opened.

 Swing Clear hinge Swing Clear Door Hinges (aka Offset Door Hinges) are perfect for residential and commercial doors, as they allow doors to swing completely clear of openings. Swing Clear Hinges can easily comply with Fair Housing Act (FHA) code by providing a minimum ADA 32” clearance clearance when using a 34” door slab.
 
Living hinge This hinge takes advantage of the flexibility of plastic to create a join between two objects without any knuckles or pins.  They are molded as a single piece, never become rusted, do not squeak, and have several other advantages over other hinges, but the plastic makes them more susceptible to breakage.

Other types include:
Coach hinge
Counterflap hinge
Cranked hinge or storm-proof hinge
Double action non-spring
Double action spring hinge
Flush hinge
Friction hinge
Lift-off hinge
Pinge: A hinge with a quick release pin.
Rising butt hinge
Security hinge
Tee hinge

Building access
Since at least medieval times there have been hinges to draw bridges for defensive purposes for fortified buildings. Hinges are used in contemporary architecture where building settlement can be expected over the life of the building. For example, the Dakin Building in Brisbane, California, was designed with its entrance ramp on a large hinge to allow settlement of the building built on piles over bay mud. This device was effective until October 2006, when it was replaced due to damage and excessive ramp slope.

Large structures
Hinges appear in large structures such as elevated freeway and railroad viaducts. These are included to reduce or eliminate the transfer of bending stresses between structural components, typically in an effort to reduce sensitivity to earthquakes. The primary reason for using a hinge, rather than a simpler device such as a slide, is to prevent the separation of adjacent components. When no bending stresses are transmitted across the hinge it is called a zero moment hinge.

Spacecraft 

People have developed a variety of self-actuating, self-locking hinge designs for spacecraft deployable structures such as solar array panels, synthetic aperture radar antennas, booms, radiators, etc.

Hinge terminology

Components
Pin The rod that holds the leaves together, inside the knuckle. Also known as a pintle.
Knuckle The hollow—typically circular—portion creating the joint of the hinge through which the pin is set. The knuckles of either leaf typically alternate and interlock with the pin passing through all of them. (aka. loop, joint, node or curl)
Leaf The portions (typically two) that extend laterally from the knuckle and typically revolve around the pin.

Characteristics
 End play Axial movement between the leaves along the axis of the pin. This motion allows the leaves to rotate without binding and is determined by the typical distance between knuckles (knuckle gap) when both edges of the leaves are aligned.
 Gauge Thickness of the leaves.
Hinge width Length from the outer edge of one leaf to the outer edge of the other leaf, perpendicularly across the pin (aka open width).
 Hinge length The length of the leaves parallel to the pin.
 Knuckle length The typical length of an individual knuckle parallel to the pin.
 Leaf width Length from the center of the pin to the outer edge of the leaf.
 Pitch Distance from the end of a knuckle to the same edge of its adjacent knuckle on the same leaf
 Door Stop A colloquialism referring to loose angular movement of the leaves relative to the pin.

Other types
Butler tray hinge Folds to 90 degrees and also snaps flat. They are for tables that have a tray top for serving.
Carpentier joint A hinge consisting of several thin metal strips of curved cross section.
Card table hinge Mortised into edge of antique or reproduction card tables and allow the top to fold onto itself.
Drop-leaf table hinge Mounted under the surface of a table with leaves that drop down. They are most commonly used with rule joints.
Hinged handcuffs a restraint device designed to secure an individual's wrists in proximity to each other consisting of two cuffs linked with a double or triple hinge. Hinged handcuffs cuffs tend to restrict movement more than chain-linked handcuffs, and they can be used to generate more leverage to force a suspect's hands behind the back, or to apply pain against the wrist, forcing the subject to comply and stop resisting.
Piano hinge (or coffin hinge) a long hinge, originally used for piano lids, but now used in many other applications where a long hinge is needed.
Living hinge a hinge consisting of material that flexes
Hinged expansion joint an expansion joint with hinges that allow the unit to bend in a single plane

Gallery

See also
 Hinge bender, a tool for adjusting hinges
 
 
 
 
 Hinge joint, a skeletal bone joint functioning like a hinge

References

External links 

 Hinge Terminology—Hingecraft; graphics visualizing many terms
 Guden Hinges and Industrial Hardware: Glossary

Hardware (mechanical)
Door furniture
Linkages (mechanical)